Zantedeschia albomaculata is a species of flowering plant in the family Araceae. It is commonly known as the spotted calla lily or white spotted arum.

References

albomaculata
Taxa named by Henri Ernest Baillon
Taxa named by William Jackson Hooker